South Korea maintains a visa waiver agreement list and a designated visa-free entry list with countries not included on those lists requiring a visa to enter the country. In addition, foreigners wishing to engage in certain activities such as diplomatic work, gainful employment, study or residence must apply for the appropriate visa prior to engaging in that activity in country.

Visa policy map

Visa-free entry (K-ETA: Korea Electronic Travel Authorization) 

In 2018, the South Korea government introduced plans for an electronic travel authorization system for visa-free foreign visitors.

The Korea Electronic Travel Authorization (K-ETA) became mandatory on 1 September 2021. K-ETA is required for all tourists of visa-free nationals.

Travelers from visa-free countries must obtain K-ETA before embarking on their journey to South Korea. Nationals of 110(+2) countries below can apply for K-ETA.

If the K-ETA application has been denied, travelers can apply for a visa.

1. 30 days for British nationals other than British citizens.

Special policy
If traveling by air to Jeju Island via Seoul, Busan, Cheongju, Muan and Yangyang, citizens of  who are traveling as part of a tourist group with an authorized travel agent may stay in mainland South Korea for up to 5 days. They may remain in Jeju for 15 days.

Non-ordinary passports
Holders of diplomatic or official service category passports of the following countries may enter without a visa:

D - diplomatic passports
O - official passports
S - service passports

1 – 60 days
2 – 30 days
2 – 60 days (diplomatic), 30 days (official)

Holders of diplomatic or service category passports of the following countries enjoy an extended length of stay when compared to ordinary passports:

But Ethiopia is yet to be ratified.

Transit
In general, travelers in transit do not require a visa to transit through South Korea for less than 24 hours (for Incheon Airport) or when departing on the same calendar day (for all other airports) as long as they stay within the transit area.

Citizens of the following countries, however, must hold a Korean visa for transit:
 
 
 
 
 

The South Korean government has special visa waiver policies for passengers in transit, which are listed below.

Transit Tourism Program
Travelers who are in transit through Incheon International Airport can participate in an organized transit tour group within Seoul. The service is free but an entry-procedure fee of KRW 10,000 or USD 10 applies. The tour can be registered in advance or joined after the traveler's arrival, and the shortest tour lasts for an hour while the longest will not exceed 5 hours.

Nationals of the following countries, as well as stateless persons and refugees, are not eligible for this service:

30-day visa exemption
 Non visa-exempt nationals who are in transit through South Korea are visa-exempt for 30 days, provided they hold a physical visa or a residence permit issued by the following countries, and meet one of the routing requirements:

 They are directly arriving in South Korea from one of these countries and going to a third country, or directly leaving South Korea to one of these countries after arriving from a third country; or,
 They are arriving in South Korea from one of these countries and have transited in a fourth country for less than 72 hours before entering South Korea, and continuing to a third country; or,
 They are leaving South Korea after arriving from a third country to one of these countries and will be transiting in a fourth country for less than 72 hours.

1 - Holders of e-visas or e-resident permits are only permitted visa-free entry if they depart from Australia.

This policy does not apply to the following nationalities:

Nationality evaluation

Under article 20 of the Nationality Act, North Koreans and Sakhalin Koreans are eligible for the evaluation of nationality. The evaluation is used to determine whether one possesses South Korean nationality based on the Nationality Act of South Korea.

As a part of the evaluation process, the applicant's personal history, family ties, migration history and current nationality (if any) will be examined by the Ministry of Justice. Successful applicants will be allowed to acquire South Korean nationality (in case of North Koreans) or have their South Korean nationality reinstated (for first-generation Sakhalin Koreans). Descendants of first-generation Sakhalin Koreans may be eligible for South Korean nationality through either express naturalization or reinstatement.

Jeju Visa Waiver Program
On 4 February 2020, due to the COVID-19 pandemic, the Jeju Visa Waiver Program was suspended by the Jeju Government. The program resumed on 1 June 2022.

All ordinary passport holders except the following can stay visa-free 30 days in Jeju Province.
Travelers using this program must hold a K-ETA approval before their flight and enter Jeju via direct flights only.

However, the above-mentioned nationalities are eligible if holding a Certificate of Invitation issued by Jeju Government or Jeju Island Immigration Office, or have previously visited South Korea for 3 times since 1996 or once since 2006 while holding permanent residence permits issued by Five Eyes countries (Australia, Canada, New Zealand, United Kingdom and the United States).

APEC Business Travel Card
Holders of passports issued by the following countries who possess an APEC Business Travel Card (ABTC) containing the "KOR" code on the reverse that it is valid for travel to South Korea can enter visa-free for business trips for up to 90 days.

ABTCs are issued to nationals of:

South Korean visas
South Korea provides visas to cover various approved activities in country.

Working Holiday Visa (H-1)
The Working Holiday Visa (H-1) is issued to young-adult foreigners in some countries which have reciprocal agreements with South Korea. Holders are allowed to stay in the country for up to one year and engage in some employment activities as well as some educational activities. However, the main purpose of the trip is intended to be vacation.
People between the ages of 18 and 25 or 30, depending on the country, are eligible for a South Korean working holiday visa.
A working holiday visa holder cannot be employed in certain jobs such as receptionist, dancer, singer, musician, acrobat, or in places of entertainment where they may endanger good morals and manners.

Overseas Study (D-2) visa
The Overseas Study (D-2) visa is issued to a foreigner who are planning to study at the undergraduate or above level of school.

Due to the high cost of education and difficulty in attracting foreign students the government considered granting special work visas to parents of students on D-2 visas in 2006. Parents would have been able to remain and work in the country for up to five years. In the same year it was noted that foreign students often taught illegally to keep up with their finances. Immigration law allowed D-2 visa holders only to work part-time in some businesses which paid an average of 3000W per hour. Students were allowed to work only 20 hours per week. However, students could earn 30000-50000W per hour teaching languages as tutors. In 2007 over 1800 foreigners on D-2 visas were found to be working illegally. Foreigners who have a D-2 visa are prohibited from working full-time. 2009 saw concern raised over Chinese nationals who overstayed their visas. There was an 11.7 times increase in overstays on the D-2 and other visas. It was also reported that "a number" of those entering on D-2 visas from China were doing so only to find a job illegally. In 2010, 68 illegal tutors on D-2 visas were caught by the immigration department.

Corporate Investment (D-8) visa
The Corporate Investment (D-8) visa is issued to foreigners who are going to own and manage a small or medium business in South Korea or who are sent as specialists to work at businesses owned by companies outside Korea. Individuals wishing to apply for this visa on their own must invest a minimum of 50 million won.

The amount of money required as an investment by foreigners to obtain the visa has risen over the years. In 1991 a foreign investor was required to invest only 25 million won, then in 2001 this was raised to 50 million won. In 2010 the government announced that it was looking to increase this further to 100 million for a number of reasons. Due to inflation, a rise in the cost of living and other costs they felt that 100 million was more representative of what was required as a minimum investment to start a business in Korea. However, there was also concern that some foreigners were taking advantage of the visa and using it to reside permanently in Korea without actually creating any business. Once the visa has been issued the government doesn't keep track of the investment, so some foreigners were using agents who provided the investment money for a fee in order for them to obtain the visa. Concern was raised that the increase would do nothing to deter abuse of the visa and would instead discourage foreign investment in Korea. The regulations surrounding the visa and foreign business ownership have been criticized for requiring a Korean guarantor even though the foreigner has invested a large sum of money and been given permission to open nearly any business they wish.

Foreign Language teaching (E-2) visa
The Foreign Language teaching (E-2) visa is issued to foreign language teachers who work in South Korea. Applicants are required to be native residents of a country whose mother tongue is the same as the language they will teach and they are also required to hold a bachelor's degree from that country. Applications are required to submit criminal background checks, health checks, sealed transcripts, verified copies of their degree, contracts and a fee to obtain the visa.

In 2007 the government introduced several new regulations to the E-2 visa. Included in these were a criminal record check, health check, and consulate/embassy interview for first-time applicants. In 2008 several English-speaking countries that were disqualified from applying for the E-2 visa denounced it as discriminatory. The Philippines ambassador met with Korean Immigration officials to try to persuade them to change the policy and allow teachers from the Philippines to teach English in South Korea. However, the government had already indicated earlier in the year that they planned to look at expanding E-2 visas to additional countries but it required the approval of various government agencies, so there was no timeframe for when it would come to fruition. In the same year, foreign instructors already working in Korea also called the rules surrounding the visa discriminatory because they were subject to health criminal and other checks, unlike other foreigners on different visas, such as ethnic Koreans born abroad or foreigners who had married Koreans. Korean Immigration responded that it was their policy to favour ethnic Koreans and that other nations and territories followed similar policies. Increasing crime was cited as a reason for the regulations, but some teachers felt it was a knee-jerk reaction to a suspected pedophile who had taught in South Korea, but never had a criminal record in the first place. Immigration again claimed the right to decide how and to whom it issued visas. Later in 2009, a challenge was filed with the National Human Rights Commission in Korea over the checks by law professor Benjamin Wagner.

Residency (F-2) visa
The Residency (F-2) visa is issued to spouses of Korean nationals or holders of the F-5 permanent residency visa. Applicants must provide documents proving financial ability and relationship. The visa is also issued to refugees who gain permanent residence status in Korea.

Concern was raised in 2008 that "unqualified foreigner teachers" were using F visas like the F-2 to gain employment in Korea. The government passed a law in 2009 that would change the visas issued to government employees of foreign countries from E7 to F2. In 2010 the government announced that foreigners who invested over US$500,000 on Jeju Island can also obtain an F-2 residency visa. It was also announced in 2010 that foreigners already on certain visas would be given an opportunity to change their visa to an F-2 visa after meeting certain criteria and accruing a certain number of points.

North Korea

Nationals of  seeking to visit South Korea cannot use North Korean passports to travel to South Korea. They must instead submit a North/South Korea visitation verification certificate as well as a departure card to the South Korean immigration officer at the port of entry and go through immigration inspection in South Korea. They must also seek authorization from the North Korean government prior to departure.

Visitor statistics
Most visitors arriving to South Korea were from the following countries of nationality:

See also

 Visa requirements for South Korean citizens
 Republic of Korea passport
 Foreign relations of South Korea

References

External links
 Korea Visa Portal
 K-ETA

Foreign relations of South Korea
South Korea